John Joseph Ratey, M.D., (born April 7, 1948) is associate clinical professor of psychiatry at Harvard Medical School.

He is the coauthor, with Edward Hallowell of the books Driven to Distraction, Answers to Distraction, and Delivered from Distraction. Like Hallowell, Ratey claims that he's got ADHD himself but like Hallowell, he's never been officially diagnosed with it apart from a self-diagnosis.

He is also the coauthor, with Catherine Johnson, of the book Shadow Syndromes: The Mild Forms of Major Mental Disorders That Sabotage Us, 1997, .

In 2001 he published the book A User's Guide to the Brain, in which he describes the human brain as a flexible muscle, which works on a "use it or lose it" basis.

He is the author of Spark: The Revolutionary New Science of Exercise and the Brain (2008), which describes the positive benefits that exercise can have for learning and for people with anxiety, depression and ADHD.

In 2014 he coauthored the book Go Wild: Free Your Body and Mind from the Afflictions of Civilization with Richard Manning which discusses new evidence & case studies about the benefits of living according to the needs of our core DNA in the areas of: food, exercise, sleep, mindfulness, being outside, being with others, and our central nerve well-being.

Ratey claims that "No-one is truly normal".

References

External links 
 
 Dr. John Ratey: Exercise and the Brain
 Interview with John Ratey
Sattelmair, Jacob; Ratey, John J.: Physically Active Play and Cognition: An Academic Matter?. American Journal of Play, Vol. 1 No. 3, Pages 365-374 Win 2009
Ratey, John J.; Loehr, James E.: The positive impact of physical activity on cognition during adulthood. Reviews in the Neurosciences, Vol. 22, Issue 2, Pages 171–185 2011

Living people
Harvard Medical School faculty
Attention deficit hyperactivity disorder researchers
1948 births